Melissa Johns is a British actor and disability activist. She is most known for playing Hannah Taylor in Mike Bartlett's BBC One drama Life and Imogen Pascoe in Coronation Street. Melissa is an ambassador for disability in the arts and advocates for better representation of disability on and off screen and stage.

Early life
She was born in Herefordshire and grew up in the Herefordshire town of Ledbury. She attended John Masefield High School. She was born without her right forearm and hand. Johns is from a working-class background and references this in her speeches. Her father, Michael Johns, is of Romany Gypsy heritage. Her brother, Jason Johns, is also an actor.

Johns trained at East 15 Acting School (University of Essex) and since graduating has worked in TV, Theatre & Radio. During her time at East 15, she was one of the first disabled actors to win the Laurence Olivier Bursary Award.

Career
In 2019, Johns was selected as one of 21 actors for the BAFTA Elevate programme. Other TV credits include Jo in SKY’s I Hate Suzie, Beth Fennel in FLACK, SKY’s In The Long Run, BBC’s Casualty, SILK & Doctors.

Theatre credits include One Flew Over The Cuckoo's Nest at Sheffield Crucible, Emilia in OthelloMacbeth at Lyric Hammersmith/HOME and Graeae’s The Iron Man. Johns is currently developing her one-woman show - SNATCHED with The Lowry and Arts Council England.

Between 2017 and 2020, she won several awards including - JCI's Ten Outstanding Young Persons in the U.K, Shaw Trust's Power List - U.K's 100 most influential disabled people, JCI's Ten Outstanding Young Persons of the World, Shortlisted for Positive Role Model Of The Year Award in the National Diversity Awards.

Johns was selected as Alumna of the Year 2019 for the University of Essex & East 15 Acting School for her work disability advocacy in the arts.

She played the part of Miss Scott in the sixth and seventh series of Grantchester the British ITV detective drama which was broadcast in 2021.

Phone hack
In 2018, her smartphone was hacked and intimate photos were released. Johns used the situation to speak out against body shaming and combat taboos around disability, sex and body dysmorphia.

The experience inspired the BBC Radio 4 drama In My Own Skin, written by Debbie Oates with Johns, and starring Johns.

References

External links
 

Year of birth missing (living people)
Living people
British actors
Actors with disabilities